Winsome Pinnock FRSL (born 1961) is a British playwright of Jamaican heritage, who is "probably Britain's most well known black female playwright". She was described in The Guardian as "the godmother of black British playwrights".

Life
Winsome Pinnock was born in Islington, North London, to parents who were both migrants from Smithville, Jamaica. Her mother was a cleaner, and her father a checker at Smithfield Meat Market. Pinnock attended Elizabeth Garrett Anderson Comprehensive Girls' School (formerly Starcross School) in Islington, and graduated from Goldsmiths' College, University of London (1979–82) with a BA (Joint Honours) degree in English and Drama, and in 1983 from Birkbeck College, University of London, with an MA degree in Modern Literature in English.

Pinnock's award-winning plays include The Winds of Change (Half Moon Theatre, 1987), Leave Taking (Liverpool Playhouse Studio, 1988; National Theatre, 1995), Picture Palace (commissioned by the Women's Theatre Group, 1988), A Hero's Welcome (Women's Playhouse Trust at the Royal Court Theatre Upstairs, 1989), A Rock in Water (Royal Court Young People's Theatre at the Theatre Upstairs, 1989; inspired by the life of Claudia Jones), Talking in Tongues (Royal Court Theatre Upstairs, 1991), Mules (Clean Break, 1996) and One Under (Tricycle Theatre, 2005). She also adapted Jean Rhys' short story "Let Them Call It Jazz" for BBC Radio 4 in 1998, and has written screenplays and television episodes. Pinnock's work is included in the 2019 anthology New Daughters of Africa, edited by Margaret Busby.

Pinnock has been Visiting Lecturer at Royal Holloway College, University of London, and Senior Visiting Fellow at the University of Cambridge. She lectures at Kingston University, London.

In 2022, Pinnock was the recipient of a Windham-Campbell Literature Prize for drama.

Awards
1991: George Devine Award
Unity Theatre Trust Award
Pearson Plays on Stage Award For Best Play of the Year
2018: Alfred Fagon Award
2022: Windham-Campbell Literature Prize (drama)

Selected works
The Winds Of Change, Half Moon Theatre, London, 1987.
Leave Taking, Playhouse, Liverpool, and National Theatre, London, 1988. Bush Theatre, May 2018.
Picture Palace, Women's Theatre Group, London, 1988.
A Rock In Water, Royal Court Young People's Theatre at the Theatre Upstairs, Royal Court Theatre, London, 1989. Published in Black Plays: 2, ed. Yvonne Brewster, London: Methuen Drama, 1989.
A Hero's Welcome, Women's Playhouse Trust at the Theatre Upstairs, Royal Court Theatre, London, 1989.
Talking In Tongues, Royal Court Theatre Upstairs, London, 1991. Published in The Methuen Drama Book of Plays by Black British Writers, Bloomsbury Methuen Drama, 2011, 
Mules, Clean Break, Royal Court Theatre, London, 1996
Can You Keep a Secret?, Cottesloe Theatre, National Theatre, London, 1999
Water, Tricycle Theatre, London, 2000.
One Under, Tricycle Theatre, London, 2005.
IDP, Tricycle Theatre, London, 2006
Taken, Soho Theatre, London, 2010.
Her Father's Daughter, BBC Radio 4.
The Dinner Party, BBC Radio 4.
Lazarus, BBC Radio 3, 2013.
The Principles of Cartography, Bush Theatre, 2017.
Rockets and Blue Lights, 2018

Further reading

References

Sources

"Bibliography: Winsome Pinnock", Contemporary Theatre and Drama in English
IDP - A play by Winsome Pinnock
 Winsome Pinnock at Black Plays Archive, National Theatre.

External links
 
 "Writer Winsome Pinnock on why she enjoyed writing Lazarus for radio", BBC Radio 3, 19 December 2012.
 "Something to be Reclaimed" (first published 1999). Jim Mulligan interviews Winsome Pinnock on Can You Keep a Secret? The collected interviews of Jim Mulligan.
 Winsome Pinnock on how Feminism influenced her writing. 1976–2014, Black Plays at the National Theatre.
 "5 Reasons You Should Know About Winsome Pinnock", Bush Theatre, 4 April 2018.
 "Meet the Writer | Winsome Pinnock | Leave Taking", YouTube, 11 April 2018.
 "Q&A with Winsome Pinnock", Alfred Fagon Award.

1961 births
Living people
Black British women writers
Alumni of Goldsmiths, University of London
Alumni of Birkbeck, University of London
20th-century British dramatists and playwrights
20th-century British women writers
English people of Jamaican descent
People from the London Borough of Islington
21st-century British dramatists and playwrights
21st-century British women writers